Mano Po 6: A Mother's Love is a 2009 Filipino drama film and the sixth installment of the Mano Po franchise, following Mano Po 5: Gua Ai Di in 2006. Produced by Regal Entertainment, Mano Po 6 marks the first and so far, only appearance of Sharon Cuneta in a Regal Entertainment film outside of her home studios Viva Films and Star Cinema. It co-stars Zsa Zsa Padilla (in her third Mano Po role), Christopher De Leon, Boots Anson-Roa (fourth appearance in the Mano Po series), Kris Aquino (in her third Mano Po role), Dennis Trillo (in another Mano Po appearance, last seen in Mano Po III: My Love), Heart Evangelista, and Ciara Sotto. This is Cuneta's reunion movie with her co-stars Christopher de Leon and Zsa Zsa Padilla from Madrasta. Joel Lamangan, who had last worked with Cuneta in Walang Kapalit directed his fifth Mano Po role.

It is also an entry to the 2009 Metro Manila Film Festival during its theater run from December 25, 2009, to January 2010.

Cast

Main Cast
Sharon Cuneta as Melinda Uy

Supporting Cast
Zsa Zsa Padilla as Olive Uy
Boots Anson-Roa as Jin Feng
Christopher De Leon as Alfonso Uy
Heart Evangelista as Stephanie Uy
Ciara Sotto as Carol Uy
Dennis Trillo as Daniel Chan
Kris Aquino as Vivienne
Zoren Legaspi as Alberto
Ryan Eigenmann as Gino
Nina Jose as Erika
Arthur Solinap as Emil
Nicole Uysiuseng as Audrey Uy 
John Manalo as Walden Uy

Special Participation
Glaiza de Castro as young Melinda
JC de Vera as young Alfonso 
Eda Nolan as teen Jin Feng 
Dominic Roco as Jin Feng's husband

Plot synopsis
Melinda is a successful businesswoman with a grim past. In the 1950s, her mother, Jin Feng, arrives in the Philippines as an unaccompanied refugee from China who marries a Filipino. A half-Chinese, half-Filipina, Melinda has faced discrimination from the Chinese community, as well as her husband's family. Forced to leave her children after her husband's death to her scornful in-laws, she tries to reconnect with a daughter, Stephanie, after so many years. However, Stephanie believes she was abandoned, and her sister-in-law, Olive, has a vendetta against her. As matters complicate further, Melinda must fight for her stolen right as a mother. Melinda eventually saves her daughter from a disastrous marriage by revealing the would-be groom's and Olive's connection to organized crime, leading to the latter's suicide when police try to arrest her. A remorseful Stephanie reconciles with Melinda.

35th Metro Manila Film Festival Awards

See also
Mano Po (Filipino film series)
Mano Po
Mano Po 2
Mano Po III: My Love
Ako Legal Wife
Mano Po 5: Gua Ai Di
Bahay Kubo: A Pinoy Mano Po!
Mano Po 7: Tsinoy

References

External links
 Mano Po 6: My Mothers Love showing this December 2009
 

2009 films
2000s Tagalog-language films
2009 drama films
Regal Entertainment films
Philippine drama films
Films directed by Joel Lamangan